Rideau Ward may refer one of the following wards in Ottawa, Ontario, Canada:

 Rideau-Rockcliffe Ward
 Rideau-Vanier Ward
 Rideau-Goulbourn Ward

It may also refer to one of two wards that are no longer used:
 Rideau Ward (1887-1980) which included areas such as New Edinburgh, Overbrook and Forbes
 Rideau Ward (2000-2006) which included the former Rideau Township

See also 
 Rideau Township, Ontario